Kings Hill is a place in the East Midlands county of Rutland, England, near the border between civil parishes of Beaumont Chase and Uppingham.

External links
 Map of Kings Hill vicinity - Via Google Earth

Geography of Rutland